Brian Francis Allen (born October 1952) is Chairman of the Hazlitt Group that includes the art dealership Hazlitt, Gooden and Fox and Arnold Wiggins and Sons, the leading dealers in historic picture frames.

He was Director of Studies at the Paul Mellon Centre for Studies in British Art between 1993 and 2012. He is a specialist in 17th- and 18th-century British art and has written widely on this subject area. He has organised a number of exhibitions in collaboration with the Yale Center for British Art, the State Hermitage Museum and the State Kremlin Museums. A past Chairman of the National Art Collections Fund he was a Trustee of the National Portrait Gallery between 2012 and 2015, the Holburne Museum of Art, the Strawberry Hill Collections Trust, the British Sporting Art Trust and is a trustee of the Hermitage Foundation UK and the Ben Uri Gallery.

Publications 
Books:

Academic Posts

References

 

British art historians
Living people
1952 births
Place of birth missing (living people)